St Martins is an inner suburb of Christchurch, New Zealand, located two kilometres south of the city centre. Primarily a residential area, St Martins is host to a small shopping mall complex situated on Wilsons Road, the main thoroughfare through the suburb.

Amenities include the Hansen, Centaurus and Saint Martins Parks.

Geography

As with most suburbs of Christchurch, St Martins does not have clearly defined boundaries and is unbound by law. The Ōpāwaho / Heathcote River is commonly used as a boundary for St Martins on three sides, separating the suburb from Beckenham to the west, Sydenham and Waltham to the north, and Opawa to the east. However, portions of these suburbs are also occasionally referred to as St Martins. The southern boundary of St Martins is traditionally associated with the bottom of the Port Hills, with the neighbouring suburbs of Huntsbury and Hillsborough occupying the hilly terrain to the south. 

Prior to European settlement, much of the suburb consisted of marshlands and swamp which were heavily connected to the ecosystem of the Ōpāwaho. Proximity to the river and the original state of the land have caused the area to suffer damage in the 2010 and 2011 earthquakes which hit the region. In many areas of the city including St Martins, ground levels dropped by 20-30 centimetres, making the already low-lying areas adjacent to the river more susceptible to flooding during periods of heavy rain.

History
The land was purchased by Henry Phillips in the early days of European settlement and converted into an orchard, which Phillips held for himself and his family. It was Phillips who first named the area St Martins, although the exact origin of this is unclear. One likely contender is that it was named after Saint Martin's Hall in London, where a gathering of Canterbury pilgrims (who Phillips was associated with) was held immediately prior to their departure for Christchurch. 

The orchard was first subdivided by Phillips in 1863 using the name St Martins, which appeared in official sources fifteen years later. As with many neighbouring suburbs, the area steadily grew throughout the late 19th and early 20th centuries, with amenities being developed through lobbying by locals. In 1923, a community group from St Martins led by a local bricklayer and trade unionist received support from Christchurch City Council to build a library as a compromise option from the group's original aim of a community hall. The library cost was officially opened in 1927 by mayor John Kendrick Archer, and by the end of that year had 273 subscribers. The library was eventually closed due to earthquake damage following the 2011 earthquake.

Demographics

St Martins had a population of 2,721 at the 2018 New Zealand census, an increase of 69 people (2.6%) since the 2013 census, and a decrease of 30 people (-1.1%) since the 2006 census. There were 1,107 households. There were 1,236 males and 1,482 females, giving a sex ratio of 0.83 males per female. The median age was 38.5 years (compared with 37.4 years nationally), with 552 people (20.3%) aged under 15 years, 477 (17.5%) aged 15 to 29, 1,248 (45.9%) aged 30 to 64, and 447 (16.4%) aged 65 or older.

Ethnicities were 89.7% European/Pākehā, 7.1% Māori, 2.4% Pacific peoples, 4.9% Asian, and 3.2% other ethnicities (totals add to more than 100% since people could identify with multiple ethnicities).

The proportion of people born overseas was 23.4%, compared with 27.1% nationally.

Although some people objected to giving their religion, 54.7% had no religion, 35.6% were Christian, 0.6% were Hindu, 0.4% were Buddhist and 2.0% had other religions.

Of those at least 15 years old, 687 (31.7%) people had a bachelor or higher degree, and 303 (14.0%) people had no formal qualifications. The median income was $37,400, compared with $31,800 nationally. The employment status of those at least 15 was that 1,104 (50.9%) people were employed full-time, 357 (16.5%) were part-time, and 48 (2.2%) were unemployed.

Education
Saint Martins School is a full primary school, which provides education for years 1 to 8. It has a roll of  students. The school opened in 1956.

Hillview Christian School is a state-integrated school for years 1 to 10. It has a roll of  students. The school was established in 1977 as St Martin Private School by the Evangelistic Church (now C3 Church Christchurch), and was originally open only to children of members of that church.

Both schools are coeducational. Rolls are as of

References

External links
 St Martins School
 St Martins Presbyterian Church

Suburbs of Christchurch